Events from the year 1851 in France.

Events
1 July - Serial poisoner Hélène Jégado is arrested in Rennes.
17 July- Victor Hugo uses the phrase United States of Europe in a speech to the National Assembly.
2 December - French coup d'état of 1851 is staged by President Louis-Napoléon Bonaparte, dissolving the National Assembly.
6 December - Trial of Hélène Jégado begins; she is eventually sentenced to death and executed by guillotine.
21 December - Constitutional referendum held, approving President Louis Napoléon Bonaparte, who had been limited to a single four-year term, serving for ten additional years.
Messageries Maritimes merchant shipping company founded as Messageries nationales, initially for service to the Middle East.
The Charles Heidsieck champagne house is established.

Births
27 March - Vincent d'Indy, composer (died 1931)
6 April - Guillaume Bigourdan, astronomer (died 1932) 
15 April - Anne Boutiaut Poulard, cook (died 1931)
21 April - Charles Barrois, geologist and palaeontologist (died 1939)
6 May - Aristide Bruant, singer, comedian and nightclub owner (died 1925)
21 May - Léon Bourgeois, politician, Prime Minister, awarded Nobel Peace Prize in 1920 (died 1925)
29 June - Jane Dieulafoy, born Jeanne Magre, archaeologist and novelist (died 1916)
30 September - Auguste Molinier, historian (died 1904)
2 October - Ferdinand Foch, Marshal of France, military theorist and writer (died 1929)

Deaths
28 February - Guillaume Dode de la Brunerie, Marshal of France, (born 1775)
19 October - Marie-Thérèse-Charlotte of France, eldest child of King Louis XVI of France (born 1778)
26 November - Jean-de-Dieu Soult, Marshal General of France and three times Prime Minister of France (born 1769)

References

1850s in France